The 2015–16 TNT KaTropa season was the 26th season of the franchise in the Philippine Basketball Association (PBA). The team was known as the TNT Tropang Texters in the Philippine Cup, Tropang TNT in the Commissioner's Cup, and TNT KaTropa in the Governors' Cup.

Key dates
August 23: The 2015 PBA draft took place at Midtown Atrium, Robinson Place Manila.

Draft picks

Roster

Philippine Cup

Eliminations

Standings

Playoffs

Bracket

Commissioner's Cup

Eliminations

Standings

Playoffs

Bracket

Governors' Cup

Eliminations

Standings

Bracket

Transactions

Trades

Off-season

Recruited imports

References

TNT Tropang Giga seasons
TNT